Elizabeth Akinyi is a Kenyan amateur boxer, and is the Kenyan national welterweight champion. She made her debut in March 2016, when she was defeated by Goramane Rady.

After primary schooling at Mid-fountain Primary School in Nairobi and Boro Primary School in Alego, she undertook her secondary education at St. Joseph's Secondary School and St. Mary's in Nairobi. Aged 14, she started boxing at St. John's Sports Society on the outskirts of Korogocho.

Akinyi won a bronze medal at the 2017 African Amateur Boxing Championships. In May 2021 she participated in her first tournament outside Africa, finishing fifth at the Konstantin Korotkov Memorial Boxing Championships in Russia, after having to withdraw from her fight against Maronta Hernandec following a scratch on her gums from a new mouthguard.

In 2021, she qualified to represent Kenya the 2020 Summer Olympics through a quota place earned through the International Olympic Committee Boxing Task Force Rankings.

References

External links
 

Living people
Kenyan women boxers
Middleweight boxers
Welterweight boxers
Boxers at the 2020 Summer Olympics
Olympic boxers of Kenya
1993 births
21st-century Kenyan women